The Desert Night Camouflage pattern is a two-color grid camouflage pattern used by the United States military during the Gulf War. It was designed to aid soldiers in concealment from Soviet-based night vision devices (NVDs). The pattern is now considered obsolete due to the increase in capability of foreign night vision devices.

Even with the pattern being obsolete, it has gained interest due to the unusual looks.

History
During the Persian Gulf War, clothing sets in this pattern were issued to U.S. soldiers, designed to be worn over the issued six-color Desert Battle Dress Uniform during nighttime operations.

No night-specific pattern has been created to replace this gear for nighttime use in a desert environment, as advancements in infrared reflectance technology in first the Desert Camouflage Uniform, and finally the Marine Corps Combat Utility Uniform and Army Combat Uniform have eliminated the need for a separate nighttime overgarment.

Design
The DNC's design was made from cross hatches and blotches, which was supposed to break up the wearer's image when looked at through various NVDs. The colors consisted of Axolotl and Laurel Green. The interior of the clothes are made from olive drab green.

The design was made for a parka, overpants and boonie hat.

Criticism

During the Gulf War, one scout/sniper section of a Marine Corps battalion conducted a night test comparing the visibility of the desert night camouflage clothing with six-color desert uniforms and winter overwhites. The night camouflage clothing proved to be more visible than both the day desert uniforms and winter overwhites when viewed though an AN/PVS-5 night vision device.

The pattern was seen as effective on NVDs that were made in the 1970s.

Users

References

Bibliography
 

United States military uniforms
Camouflage patterns
Military camouflage
Military equipment introduced in the 1990s